Xu Anbang (born 14 June 1999) is a Chinese footballer.

Club career
Xu has been loaned from Shandong Taishan to lower league Chinese sides Zibo Cuju, Kunshan and Quanzhou Yassin.

Career statistics

Club
.

References

External links
 

1999 births
Living people
People from Zhengzhou
Footballers from Henan
Chinese footballers
Chinese expatriate footballers
Association football midfielders
China League Two players
China League One players
Villarreal CF players
Shandong Taishan F.C. players
F.C. Felgueiras 1932 players
Zibo Cuju F.C. players
Kunshan F.C. players
Chinese expatriate sportspeople in Spain
Expatriate footballers in Spain
Chinese expatriate sportspeople in Portugal
Expatriate footballers in Portugal